Calamotropha heliocaustus is a moth in the family Crambidae. It was described by Wallengren in 1876. It is found in South Africa and Zimbabwe.

References

Crambinae
Moths described in 1876